Starogard, Starogród, or Stargard means  old fort or old city in Polish, Polabian and Pomeranian languages, and gard is Old Slavic, Old Germanic, Old Baltic, and Old Finnic for castle or fortification. Places with those names include:

Poland 
 Stargard  (right after World War II known as Starogród), a town in West Pomeranian Voivodeship, that is the seat of Stargard County.
 Starogard Gdański, a town in Pomeranian Voivodeship, seat of Starogard County
 Starogard Łobeski, a village in West Pomeranian Voivodeship
 Stargard Gubiński, a village in Lubusz Voivodeship (W Poland)
 Santok, also known as Stargard, a village in Lubusz Voivodeship
 Starogród, Masovian Voivodeship
 Starogród Dolny, a village in the Kuyavian-Pomeranian Voivodeship
 Starogród Górny, a village in the Kuyavian-Pomeranian Voivodeship

Germany 
 Burg Stargard (until 1929: Stargard; Polabian: Stargart), town in Mecklenburg-Western Pomerania
 Stargard Castle, castle in Burg Stargard
 Lordship of Stargard, a region in North Germany named after Burg Stargard
 Stargarder Land, a modern parish
 Stargarder Land (wine region)
 Oldenburg in Holstein (originally: Starigard), town in Wagria, Schleswig-Holstein
 Sagard, town on the island of Rügen, Mecklenburg-Western Pomerania

States 
 Duchy of Mecklenburg-Stargard, duchy in Mecklenburg, existing from 1352 to 1471
 Duchy of Pomerania-Stargard duchy in Pomerania existing from 1377 to 1478

Others 
 Stargard (band), an American funk/soul band
 Stargard (album)

See also 
 Gord (Slavic settlement)